was the fourth of the sixty-nine stations of the Nakasendō. It is located in the Ōmiya ward and Kita ward of the present-day city of Saitama, Saitama Prefecture, Japan.

History
Larger than its two neighboring post towns, Urawa-shuku and Ageo-shuku, Ōmiya-shuku was recorded to have had a population of over 1,500 people with over 300 homes during the Tenpō era. It also had the largest number (nine) of secondary honjin along the Nakasendō.

Neighboring post towns
Nakasendō
Urawa-shuku - Ōmiya-shuku - Ageo-shuku

References

Stations of the Nakasendō
Stations of the Nakasendō in Saitama Prefecture